Surattha obeliscota is a species of moth in the family Crambidae. It is found on Cyprus, as well as in Lebanon.

References

Moths described in 1892
Ancylolomiini